WTVY-FM ("Your Country" 95.5 WTVY) is an American radio station licensed to serve the community of Dothan, Alabama, United States.  The station is owned by Digio Strategies.  The station began broadcasting on September 20, 1968; the station was originally owned by Woods Communications Corporation as a sister to WTVY television.

Programming
WTVY-FM airs a country music format.

References

External links
WTVY-FM official website

TVY
Country radio stations in the United States
Houston County, Alabama